Esy or ESY may refer to

 Esy Morales, Puerto Rican musician
 Edible Schoolyard
 Extended School Year
 ESY (Greek: Εθνικό Σύστημα Υγείας, ΕΣΥ), the National Healthcare Service in Greece